Saywani (Aymara: saywa heap of stones indicating a landmark, -ni a suffix, "the one with a landmark", also spelled Sayhuani) is a mountain north of the Cordillera Real in the Andes of Bolivia which reaches a height of approximately . It is located in the La Paz Department, Larecaja Province, Quiabaya Municipality. Saywani lies northeast of Achachi Qala. The little lake south of Saywani is named Ch'uxña Quta ("green lake").

References 

Mountains of La Paz Department (Bolivia)